The Craigieburn railway line (previously the Broadmeadows line and Essendon line) is a commuter rail passenger train service operating between Craigieburn in the northern suburbs and Flinders Street in Melbourne, Australia. The service is part of the Public Transport Victoria metropolitan rail network.

Description

The line rises steadily after leaving North Melbourne until after Essendon, then drops a little to cross Moonee Ponds Creek, and soon after encounters the Glenroy Bank, a continuous rising gradient of 1 in 50 for nearly  that taxed locomotive-hauled trains in the days of steam. After Glenroy, it continues to rise Craigieburn and beyond. Earthworks are, however, generally moderate.

The almost-continuous gradients were a factor when, in 2003, an unmanned suburban train rolled the length of the line from Broadmeadows to the city, and crashed into a stationary but loaded passenger train waiting to depart Spencer Street station. No one was killed or seriously injured.

Infrastructure
The line is double track throughout, and controlled by automatic block signalling. It has numerous level crossings and many
grade-separated road and rail bridges.
Terminating facilities are at Kensington, Newmarket (by shunting onto the Flemington Racecourse line), Essendon, Broadmeadows and Craigieburn. Only Essendon, Broadmeadows, and Craigieburn are normally used, the latter two daily and Essendon in special circumstances. Train stabling is at Broadmeadows and Craigieburn.

History
The line from North Melbourne to Essendon was opened by the Melbourne & Essendon Railway Company in November 1860. Soon after, the company opened a branch from Newmarket to Flemington Racecourse. Both lines closed after only a short time, in July 1864. The Victorian Railways reopened the Flemington Racecourse line (including the Essendon line as far as Newmarket) in November 1867, and in January 1871 to Essendon.

In April 1872, the line was extended to a temporary terminus outside Seymour, awaiting completion of a bridge over the Goulburn River. In December 1894, through services were provided from Essendon to Brighton Beach on the Sandringham line.

Automatic Block Signalling started to appear on the line in 1918, with Kensington to Essendon being converted in June of that year, and North Melbourne to Kensington in October. In May 1919, Flinders Street to Essendon and the Sandringham line were the first lines to be electrified in Melbourne, apart from a test installation on the Flemington Racecourse line.

In January 1924, an extra pair of tracks, including a flying junction, opened between North Melbourne and Kensington, enabling the separation of passenger and goods traffic in the busy section. Further works were carried out in 1929, when the double track Albion – Jacana freight line was opened, permitting freight trains to avoid the line via Essendon. Automatic Block Signalling was extended to Broadmeadows in November 1965.

On 30 September 2007 electrification was extended from Broadmeadows to Craigieburn. Previously, passengers for Craigieburn travelled on V/Line diesel services, but Metcards were accepted.

Broadstore branch
A branch line was provided during the Second World War to Broadstore, commencing at the north-east of Broadmeadows station, opening on 12 October 1942, and remaining in place until 1982; the tracks were not lifted until after 1991. The Broadstore Line was unelectrified, and extended in a directly easterly direction for approximately  towards the Upfield Line terminating at the Maygar Barracks in Campbellfield. At one time, according to Forsberg, it had a branch that supplied a migrant hostel. The Broadstore Line is clearly marked on the 1980 map of Victorian Railways.

Proposals
As mentioned in the Network Development Plan, the Craigieburn line will eventually link up with the Frankston line to form one long through-routed line. This line would avoid Southern Cross and Flinders Street, instead travelling via North Melbourne, Flagstaff, Melbourne Central, Parliament and Richmond through a modified tunnel. In the shorter term, a level crossing removal at the Glenroy Road level crossing, by lowering the rail line under the road, was completed in 2022 with the Glenroy Station rebuilt as part of the construction works. Previous to the crossing removal the boom gates were closed for around 43% of the morning peak, delaying some of the 19,000 vehicles which passed through daily.

References

External links
Timetables
Statistics and detailed schematic map at the vicsig enthusiast website

Railway lines in Melbourne
Railway lines opened in 1860
1860 establishments in Australia
Public transport routes in the City of Melbourne (LGA)
Transport in the City of Moonee Valley
Transport in the City of Hume
1500 V DC railway electrification